This is a season-by-season list of records compiled by Notre Dame in men's ice hockey.

Season-by-season results

Note: GP = Games played, W = Wins, L = Losses, T = Ties

* Winning percentage is used when conference schedules are unbalanced.

Footnotes

References

 
Lists of college men's ice hockey seasons in the United States
Notre Dame Fighting Irish ice hockey seasons